Premonition 13 (also Wino's Premonition) is a project by The Obsessed and Saint Vitus' vocalist/guitarist Scott "Wino" Weinrich. The project started in 2009 with Wino's jam colleague of 20 years Jim Karow. Matthew Clark was later brought in to play drums.

Members
 Scott "Wino" Weinrich — vocals, guitars, bass
 Jim Karow — guitars, vocals
 Matthew Clark — drums
 Brian Daniloski — bass (live session)

Discography
"Switchhouse" / "Crossthreaded" (single), 2011
 13 (album), 2011
Premonition 13 / Radio Moscow / Earthless — split 12" (EP), 2012 (track: "Noche Oscura")

References

External links
 Website at Volcom Entertainment
 MySpace
 YouTube

American doom metal musical groups
Musical groups established in 2010
2010 establishments in Maryland
Musical groups disestablished in 2012